Tony Kuhn (born December 15, 1975) is a former U.S. soccer forward who spent two seasons in Major League Soccer and several in the USL First Division, USISL and Premier Development League.

Kuhn attended Vanderbilt University, where he played on the men's soccer team from 1994 to 1997.  He holds the school's records for goalscoring in a single season with 23, for career goals with 58, and for career assists with 27.  He was a 1996 First Team and a 1997 Second Team All American.  He graduated in the spring of 1998.  That year, the Nashville Metros selected Kuhn in the first round of the USL Draft.  He also played for the Milwaukee Rampage on loan from the Metros.  In 1998, Kuhn signed with the Chicago Fire of Major League Soccer.  He played five games with the Fire in 1998, but was placed on waivers on April 2, 1999.  Four days later, the New England Revolution claimed Kuhn off waivers. He played six games for the Revs before being traded to the Miami Fusion in exchange for Carlos Parra on June 4, 1999.  The Fusion waived Kuhn on November 25, 1999.  In 2002, Kuhn began the season with the Memphis Express in the Premier Development League before finishing it with the Atlanta Silverbacks in the USL A-League.

References

1975 births
Living people
American soccer players
Soccer players from Tennessee
Atlanta Silverbacks players
Chicago Fire FC players
Major League Soccer players
Memphis Express (soccer) players
Miami Fusion players
Milwaukee Rampage players
Nashville Metros players
New England Revolution players
A-League (1995–2004) players
USL League Two players
Vanderbilt Commodores men's soccer players
MLS Pro-40 players
All-American men's college soccer players
Association football forwards